AMPA is a chemical compound that mimics the effects of glutamate in the central nervous system.

AMPA may also refer to:
 American Military Partner Association, a U.S. LGBT advocacy and support group
 Aminomethylphosphonic acid, a degradation product of the herbicide glyphosate
Asociación de Madres y Padres de Alumnos, Spanish association similar to Parent-Teacher Association